Grétarsson is an Icelandic patronym, meaning son of Grétar. Notable people with the last name include:
Arnar Grétarsson (born 1972), Icelandic football manager and former footballer
Daníel Leó Grétarsson (born 1995), Icelandic footballer
Helgi Grétarsson (born 1977), Icelandic chess grandmaster
Hilmar Grétarsson (born 1982), Icelandic journalist
Hjörvar Steinn Grétarsson (born 1993), Icelandic chess grandmaster
Reynir Grétarsson (born 1972), Icelandic businessman
Sigurður Grétarsson (born 1962), Icelandic football manager and former footballer

Icelandic-language surnames